Laura Alonso may refer to:
 Laura Alonso (soprano) (born 1976), Spanish operatic soprano
 Laura Alonso (politician) (born 1972), Argentine politician